Bjørn Storberget (July 5, 1921 – September 29, 1999) was a Norwegian writer.

Storberget was born in Langesund. Storberget's career was connected with the Norwegian postal service. He started working for the postal service in 1938, and in 1939 he worked as a student at the Langesund post office. He also performed postal work in Larvik and Kristiansand. He took the postal examination in 1941. In 1942 he was employed as the head postal assistant in Vadsø, and on January 1, 1947, at the post office in Asker.

Storberget took over editing of the magazine POST in 1956 in addition to his usual work in Asker. Alongside his job as an editor, Storberget was also responsible for external information, such as preparing brochures and maintaining contact with the press. Gradually, the information service or editor's office was expanded, and Storberget became involved in the stamp service, among other things.

With the reorganization of the Norwegian Postal Administration in 1974 and 1975, its information and market function was strengthened. A separate information section (TI) was placed under the Traffic Department with Storberget as the head. The section had a separate information office (TII), a sales office (TIS), and a philately office (TIF). Under the philately office were also the Postal Museum and the Postal Library. In 1985, the information office was placed under the marketing department (MMI).

Storberget's interests included journalism, and he wrote short stories that were published in the weekly press and had several books published. He was also a member of the Norwegian Post Organization's district board and an auditor, a member of the civil servant committee, and the treasurer of the vacation home board in the Norwegian Post Organization's Telemark district.

Storberget received the King's Medal of Merit in gold in recognition of his services in 1991.

Books
1943: Gutteklubben i kamp
1945: Den usynlige fronten
1945: Sleipner
1946: Hjemløs
1948: På farlige eventyr
1949: Rømlingene
1953: Alle gutters fotballbok (with Kristian Henriksen)
1963: Postmannen og postdikteren Knut Hamsun
197?: Postens virksomhet i Norge
1980: Ord om brevet
1990: En tur gjennom Postens historie
1994: Postens OL-bok
1995: Posten får vinger
1997: Mennesker i Posten gjennom 350 år

Television and film
1953: Skøytekongen, concept for the film script
1955: Frimerket jubilerer, film script
1976: Nynytt as himself

References

1921 births
1999 deaths
20th-century Norwegian male writers
Norwegian magazine editors
Recipients of the King's Medal of Merit in gold